McElhone is a surname. Notable people with the surname include:

Arthur McElhone (1868–1946), Australian politician
Eric McElhone (1887–1981), Australian cricketer
Frank McElhone (1929–1982), Scottish politician
Helen McElhone (1933–2013), Scottish politician
Jack McElhone (born 1993), Scottish actor
John McElhone (1833–1898), Australian politician
Johnny McElhone (born 1963), Scottish guitarist and songwriter
Natascha McElhone (born 1971), English actress